Hao Jialu (born 20 August 1987 in Taiyuan, Shanxi) is a Chinese fencer. She represented her country at the 2016 Summer Olympics, where she won the silver medal in the women's team épée event.

References 

1987 births
Living people
Chinese female fencers
Chinese épée fencers
Olympic fencers of China
Olympic medalists in fencing
Fencers at the 2016 Summer Olympics
2016 Olympic silver medalists for China
Asian Games medalists in fencing
Fencers at the 2014 Asian Games
Asian Games gold medalists for China
Medalists at the 2014 Asian Games
Fencers from Shanxi
Sportspeople from Taiyuan
21st-century Chinese women